The Awadhi people  or Awadhis (Awadhi/Hindi: अवधी,) are an Indo-Aryan ethno-linguistic group who speak the Awadhi dialect and reside in the Awadh region of Uttar Pradesh. Many Awadhis also migrated to Madhya Pradesh, Bihar, Jharkhand, Gujarat, Maharashtra, Odisha in India and some adjoining regions of the Terai in Nepal, and in addition 1.9 per cent of Nepalis are Awadhi speakers. Awadhi people can be found throughout the world, most notably in Fiji, Guyana, Mauritius, South Africa, Suriname, and Trinidad and Tobago. Bollywood actor and superstar Amitabh Bachchan is Awadhi from his father's (Harivansh Rai Bachchan) side. Historically, Indo-Aryans dominated the North Indian Gangetic Planes; thus, the Awadhi language continuously evolved over the centuries in the Awadh region of Uttar Pradesh.

Language 

The Awadhi language is spoken by about 55 million people. In India, native speakers are estimated to be 65 million, while in Nepal native speakers are estimated to be 500,000 people.

Linguistically, Awadhi is a distinct language with its own grammar. However, many consider Awadhi to be a dialect of Hindi. Awadhi is not formally taught in any institution.

Cuisine 

Consisting of both vegetarian and non vegetarian dishes, Awadhi cuisine has influences that can be linked to the Mughal Empire. It is similar to cuisines from surrounding areas, such as Bhojpur, Kashmir, Central Asia, Punjab, and Hyderabad. Awadhi cuisine is known for its use of aromatics and spices, such as cardamom and saffron , in a slow fire cooking process. There is also notable variety in ingredients that are cooked, such as paneer and mutton.

In addition, there are rice, curry, dessert, and chaat preparations that are specific to Awadhi cuisine.

Notable Awadhis

Afroz Ahmad
Muzaffar Ali
Nahshad Ali
Abhishek Bachchan
Amitabh Bachchan
Harivansh Rai Bachchan
Piaa Bajpai
Sarita Bhadauria
Nivedita Bhattacharya
Pali Chandra
Abhishek Chaubey
Rudrasen Chaudhary
Narendra Deva
Shanta Devi
Babu Gulabrai
Ali Sardar Jafri
Cheddi Jagan
Kailas Nath Kaul
Imdad Khan
Wahid Khan
Akhil Kumar
Ram Manohar Lohia
Amaresh Misra
Satish Mishra
Gopaldas Neeraj
Shringi Rushi
Babu Himmat Sah
Anushka Sharma
Ramchandra Shukla
Lal Pratap Singh
Babu Bhoop Singh
Bajrang Bahadur Singh
Nivedita Tiwari
Bekal Utsahi
Bhagwati Charan Verma
Anand Sen Yadav
Mitrasen Yadav

References

Ethnic groups in India
Ethnic groups divided by international borders
Ethnic groups in Nepal

hi:अवधी लोग